Bunzi, in Kongo  mythology (mainly in Woyo people), is a goddess of rain. She is the daughter of Mboze, the Great Mother. Bunzi appears as a multicolored serpent, and rewards those who worship her with an abundant harvest. Mboze took her own son, Makanga, as a lover and gave birth to Bunzi. Upon seeing that Mboze had given birth to a serpent, Mboze's husband Kuitikuiti knew that she had been unfaithful to him, and killed her. Bunzi took on her mother's rain-bringing power. According to legend, when a rainbow appears in the sky, that is Bunzi. Sometimes she can also be seen in the rippling water of the river at sunset. 

In some  Kongo tribes, Bunzi is called Mpulu Bunzi and is considered as a male spirit of rain and twin phenomenon. He was friend with Nzazi, the god of thunder. According to others legends, Mpulu Bunzi beheaded Mbumba, the rainbow serpent, following an argument.

The Bunzi Mons, a mountain on Venus, is named after her.

See also
 Mami Wata

References 

African goddesses

Rain deities
Legendary serpents